The Udet U 12 Flamingo was an aerobatic sports plane and trainer aircraft developed in Germany in the mid-1920s.

Design and development
The U 12 was a conventional, single-bay biplane of wooden construction with the wings braced by large I-struts. The pilot and instructor or passenger sat in tandem, open cockpits. The U 12 proved extremely popular and sold well, due in no small part to Ernst Udet's spectacular aerobatics routines while flying the aircraft. One particularly acclaimed part of his act included swooping down towards the airfield and picking up a handkerchief with the tip of one wing. The popularity of this aircraft was insufficient to rescue Udet Flugzeugbau from its dire financial position, but when the company's assets were taken over by the state of Bavaria to form BFW, production of the U 12 soon resumed in earnest. BFW-built U 12s were exported to Austria, Hungary and Latvia, and later built under licence in these countries as well.

Variants

Germany
 U 12a: main production version with Siemens-Halske Sh 11 engine
 U 12W: float-equipped U 12a (Wasser—"water")
 U 12b: version strengthened for aerobatics and with improved wing design
 U 12c: advanced trainer with reduced wing area
 U 12d: U 12b with Siemens-Halske Sh 12 engine
 U 12e: U 12c with Siemens-Halske Sh 12 engine

Austria
20 aircraft produced by Fliegerwerft Thalerhof
 U 12H: standard U 12a (Holz—"wood")
 U 12S: U 12a with redesigned fuselage of fabric-covered steel tube construction (Stahl—"steel").
 U 12Ö: alternative designation for U 12S (Österreich—"Austria")

Hungary
Forty aircraft produced by KRG and another 40 by Manfred Weiss Works. Some examples armed and used for fighter or bomber training
 Hungária I: similar to U 12a with N-type interplane struts
 Hungária II: similar to U 12a with N-type interplane struts
 Hungária III: similar to U 12a with N-type interplane struts, propeller spinner and Townend ring
 Hungária IV: similar to U 12a. Only Hungarian-built version with I-type interplane struts
 Hungária V: similar to U 12a with N-type interplane struts

Operators
 
 Austrian Air Force (1927–1938)
 
 Royal Hungarian Air Force
 
 Latvian Air Force

Survivors

No original aircraft are known to exist. An airworthy replica was kept at the Deutsches Museum but crashed at the 2013 Tannkosh event.

Specifications (U 12a)

References

 
 
 German aircraft between 1919–1945
 Уголок неба

External links

1920s German civil trainer aircraft
U 12
Aerobatic aircraft
Weiss Manfred aircraft
Biplanes
Single-engined tractor aircraft
Aircraft first flown in 1925